Mary Matilyn Mouser is an American actress. She is best known for her portrayal of Samantha LaRusso in the Netflix series Cobra Kai, and
Lacey Fleming on the ABC series Body of Proof. She also took over the role of Karen Grant, Fitz & Mellie's daughter on Scandal in Season 4.

Early life and career 
Mouser started her career at the age of six when she was chosen as a photo-double for Abigail Breslin's character in Signs. 

She was featured on the Starz Kids & Family series Eloise: The Animated Series as the voice of Eloise and appeared as the child-lead in the Hallmark Channel original movie A Stranger's Heart. She has done voice work for animated features such as Dragon Hunters, Tarzan II, and Pom Poko, and was a voice actress in the audio drama series, Adventures in Odyssey as Samantha McKay, younger sister of Grady McKay.

She has also appeared in guest starring roles on CSI: Crime Scene Investigation, Without a Trace, The King of Queens, Monk, Inconceivable, Scrubs, One Life to Live and had a recurring role on NCIS as Leroy Jethro Gibbs' daughter Kelly. She also had a series regular role in the CW series Life Is Wild as Mia Weller, for 13 episodes. At the 2006 Best of Fest Awards at the KIDS FIRST! Film and Video Festival, Mouser received the Outstanding Performance Award for her voiceover work in Eloise: The Animated Series. Mouser also guest starred on Lie To Me and in Ghost Whisperer as the character Madison.

Mouser starred in the ABC medical drama Body of Proof as Dana Delany's daughter, Lacey Fleming. Mouser played the roles of both Savannah O’Neal and Emma Reynolds in the Disney Channel Original movie Frenemies, which was released in 2012.

Since 2018, she plays high school and karate student Samantha (Sam) LaRusso, in the Cobra Kai series, initially launched by YouTube Premium and later on Netflix, where she is part of the main cast.
Mary has also appeared on a Mind Field episode (S2 E5) on the channel VSauce on YouTube.

Personal life 
In 2009, Mouser was diagnosed with type 1 diabetes.

Filmography

Films

Television

Video games

Awards and nominations

References

External links
 Mary Mouser at rottentomatoes.com

Living people
21st-century American actresses
Actresses from Arkansas
American child actresses
American film actresses
American television actresses
People with type 1 diabetes